Asquerino is a Spanish surname. Notable people with the surname include:

Eduardo Asquerino (1826–1881), Spanish politician, journalist, author and poet
Eusebio Asquerino (1822–1892), Spanish poet and playwright
María Asquerino (1925–2013), Spanish actress

Spanish-language surnames